HLB may refer to:

 Halbi language of central India
 Helium light band, unit of surface flatness
 Hessian Ludwig Railway, a former German railway company
 Hessische Landesbahn, a German transport company
 High level bombing
 Hildenborough railway station, in England
 Hillsborough Resources, a Canadian coal-mining company
 HLB International, an international network of accountancy firms
 H.L. Boulton, a Venezuelan import and export company
 H. L. Bourgeois High School, in Gray, Louisiana, United States
 Hong Leong Bank, a Malaysian bank
 Huanglongbing, a disease of citrus fruits
 Hydrophilic-lipophilic balance, of a surfactant
 The Helminthosporium Leaf Blights, from their former classification in the genus Helminthosporium:
Southern corn leaf blight
Northern corn leaf blight
Northern corn leaf spot